
Gmina Nowogród Bobrzański is an urban-rural gmina (administrative district) in Zielona Góra County, Lubusz Voivodeship, in western Poland.

Villages
Apart from the town of Nowogród Bobrzański, Gmina Nowogród Bobrzański contains the villages and settlements of Białowice, Bogaczów, Cieszów, Dobroszów Mały, Dobroszów Wielki, Drągowina, Kaczenice, Kamionka, Klępina, Kotowice, Krzewiny, Krzywa, Krzywaniec, Łagoda, Niwiska, Pajęczno, Pielice, Pierzwin, Podgórzyce, Popowice, Przybymierz, Skibice, Sobolice, Sterków, Turów, Urzuty and Wysoka.

Neighbouring gminas
Gmina Nowogród Bobrzański is bordered by the gminas of Bobrowice, Brzeźnica, Dąbie, Jasień, Kożuchów, Lubsko, Świdnica, Żagań, Żary and Zielona Góra.

Twin towns – sister cities

Gmina Nowogród Bobrzański is twinned with:
 Cimișlia, Moldova
 Lübbenau, Germany
 Westerwolde, Netherlands

References

Nowogrod Bobrzanski
Zielona Góra County